
Gmina Siemkowice is a rural gmina (administrative district) in Pajęczno County, Łódź Voivodeship, in central Poland.

Villages
Gmina Siemkowice contains the villages and settlements of Borki, Bugaj Radoszewicki, Delfina, Ignaców, Katarzynopole, Kije, Kolonia Lipnik, Laski, Lipnik, Łukomierz, Mazaniec, Miętno, Mokre, Ożegów, Pieńki Laskowskie, Radoszewice, Siemkowice and Zmyślona.

Neighbouring gminas
Gmina Siemkowice is bordered by the gminas of Działoszyn, Kiełczygłów, Osjaków, Pajęczno and Wierzchlas.

References
Polish official population figures 2006

Siemkowice
Pajęczno County